The 2016 BetVictor Welsh Open was a professional ranking snooker tournament held at the Motorpoint Arena in Cardiff from 15 to 21 February 2016. It was the sixth ranking event of the 2015/2016 season.
 		
The defending champion John Higgins lost 1–4 against Michael White in the last 16.

Playing Barry Pinches in the first round, Ronnie O'Sullivan declined the opportunity to make a maximum break, describing the £10,000 prize money on offer as "too cheap". He potted the pink off the penultimate red and made a 146. World Snooker chairman Barry Hearn called O'Sullivan's actions "unacceptable" and "disrespectful".

Ding Junhui made the 117th official maximum break in the sixth frame of his quarter-final against Neil Robertson. It was Ding's sixth maximum break in professional competition.

O'Sullivan met Robertson in the final. From 2–5 behind, O'Sullivan won seven frames in a row, finishing with a break of 141 in the 14th frame, to defeat Robertson 9–5 and equal John Higgins's record of four Welsh Open titles. It was O'Sullivan's 28th ranking title, which put him in joint second place with Higgins and Steve Davis for the number of career ranking titles.

Prize fund
The breakdown of prize money is shown below:

Winner: £60,000
Runner-up: £30,000
Semi-finals: £20,000
Quarter-finals: £10,000
Last 16: £5,000
Last 32: £3,000
Last 64: £2,000

Highest break: £2,000
Total: £324,000

The "rolling 147 prize" for a maximum break was £10,000 (2nd ranking event since it was last won, £5,000 added for each ranking event)

Main draw
128 players started the tournament with 12 tables in the arena in the early stages.

Top half

Section 1

Section 2

Section 3

Section 4

Bottom half

Section 5

Section 6

Section 7

Section 8

Finals

Final

Century breaks

147, 126, 120  Ding Junhui
146, 141, 132, 132, 131, 124, 112, 110, 102, 101  Ronnie O'Sullivan
141, 140, 126, 107  Neil Robertson
139, 130  Joe Perry
139  Peter Ebdon
137, 115, 105, 104, 100  John Higgins
135, 125, 124, 105  Mark Allen
135, 108  Shaun Murphy
134  Mark Davis
133  Allan Taylor
133  Eden Sharav
131  Matthew Stevens
130  Martin O'Donnell
128, 115  Mark Selby
127  Rod Lawler
126, 112  Anthony Hamilton
124, 112  Judd Trump
118, 101  Michael White
116, 101  Marco Fu

115  Jack Lisowski
115  Tom Ford
114, 105  Robin Hull
113  Lee Walker
113  Robbie Williams
112  Itaro Santos
111  Kurt Maflin
110, 109  Alan McManus
107  Anthony McGill
107  Martin Gould
107  Michael Holt
106, 103  Liang Wenbo
105  Dechawat Poomjaeng
105  Michael Wasley
104  David Grace
104  Gary Wilson
103  David Gilbert
103  Mike Dunn
102  Ashley Hugill

References

Welsh Open (snooker)
Welsh Open
Welsh Open
Welsh Open
Sports competitions in Cardiff